The Big Top (also known as the Big Top Auditorium and The Arena; commonly known as Big Top Sydney) is a multi-purpose entertainment venue located within Luna Park Sydney. Opening in 2004, the venue was a part of the amusement park’s 2003 redevelopment plan. It has a capacity of nearly 3,000, making it one of Sydney’s largest mid-sized venues.

It has housed notable events such as: the 2005 MTV Australia Video Music Awards, Come Together Music Festival and the 2013 Sydney Darts Masters.

History
The venue was originally proposed in 1999 by Metro Edgley Pty Ltd. Known as Luna Circus, the building was proposed as a venue for circus acts and a possible site for a permanent Cirque du Soleil show. Plans were underway to begin construction in 2000, opening in 2001. However, the proposal was not approved by the North Sydney Council until December 2002. Construction began in February 2003 and was completed in December. It was built on the site of the former Ghost Train.

An opening celebration concert was held 2 April 2004. It was hosted by Simon Burke and featured performances by Caroline O'Connor, Marina Prior and David Campbell. The first official event held at the venue was a performance of Sunset Boulevard (featuring Judi Connelli and Michael Cormick) on 3 April 2004. Australian bands that have performed at Luna Park include INXS in '82, Silverchair in '97, Jet (at Big Top) in '09, Sick Puppies (at Big Top) in '07, and Parkway Drive (at Big Top) in '09.

Performers

The Amity Affliction
Architects
Avenged Sevenfold
ATEEZ
B.A.P
Bastille
Benee
Boyz II Men
Bruno Mars
Bullet for My Valentine
Calvin Harris
Chicago
DMX
Dua Lipa 
The Dandy Warhols
The Darkness
The Doobie Brothers
Franz Ferdinand
The Fray
Goldfrapp
Good Charlotte
got7
Ice Cube
iKon 
Incubus
INXS
Ja Rule
Jessie J
Korn
Kylie Minogue
Lily Allen
Meghan Trainor
Mýa
New Found Glory
Nick Cave and the Bad Seeds
Nine Inch Nails
Paramore
The Prodigy
Queens of the Stone Age
Rita Ora
Rob Zombie
Scissor Sisters
The Script
Sean Paul
Seventeen
Slayer
The Smashing Pumpkins
Soundgarden
Spacey Jane
Steel Panther
Stray Kids
Switchfoot
The Try Guys
Vengaboys
VIXX
You Me at Six

References

External links
 

Boxing venues in Australia
Buildings and structures completed in 2003
Buildings and structures in Sydney
Music venues in Sydney
Darts venues
2004 establishments in Australia
Indoor arenas in Australia